Mario Valery-Trabucco (born February 19, 1987) is a Canadian professional ice hockey forward. He currently plays for the Hannover Scorpions in the German Oberliga.

Trabucco graduated from Union College in 2010, and went on to play in two games with the Adirondack Phantoms of the American Hockey League during the 2009–10 AHL season. In the following 2010–11 season, Trabucco played in Finland for TPS of the SM-liiga.

On July 6, 2011, Valery-Trabucco then moved to the German DEL, signing a one-year contract with Augsburger Panther.

He joined Manchester Storm of the EIHL for the 2016/2017 season. In June 2017, he moved to Gothiques d'Amiens in the Ligue Magnus.

In 2019, Trabucco signed for German Oberliga side Hannover Scorpions.

Awards and honours

References

External links

1987 births
Living people
Adirondack Phantoms players
Augsburger Panther players
Canadian ice hockey forwards
Hannover Scorpions players
Ice hockey people from Montreal
HC TPS players
Union Dutchmen ice hockey players
Manchester Storm (2015–) players
Canadian expatriate ice hockey players in England
Canadian expatriate ice hockey players in Finland
Canadian expatriate ice hockey players in Germany